Servílio de Jesús (15 April 1914 – 10 April 1984) was a Brazilian footballer. He played in six matches for the Brazil national football team from 1942 to 1945. He was also part of Brazil's squad for the 1942 South American Championship.

References

External links
 
 

1914 births
1984 deaths
Brazilian footballers
Brazil international footballers
Place of birth missing
Association football forwards
Galícia Esporte Clube players
Esporte Clube Bahia players
Sport Club Corinthians Paulista players
Brazilian football managers
Sport Club Corinthians Paulista managers